Power Trip is an American crossover thrash band formed in Dallas, Texas, in 2008. By 2020, Power Trip's lineup consisted of Riley Gale (lead vocals), Blake Ibanez (lead guitar), Nick Stewart (rhythm guitar), Chris Whetzel (bass) and Chris Ulsh (drums); the latter replaced drummer Marcus Johnson, who left in 2009. They have released two studio albums to date, Manifest Decimation (2013) and Nightmare Logic (2017), plus a compilation including their early tracks and a live album. 

Power Trip was one of the most successful thrash metal bands of the 2010s, with Nightmare Logic entering the Billboard charts, and receiving a number of accolades by publications. A live version of the song "Executioner’s Tax (Swing of the Axe)" received a nomination for the Grammy Award for Best Metal Performance.

History

In 2013, the band signed with the Southern Lord Records label and released their first studio album, Manifest Decimation. Their second album, Nightmare Logic, was released in 2017 to critical acclaim. The Guardian mentioned that singer Riley Gale's lyrics on Nightmare Logic, were about "social inequality and activism". He described Nightmare Logic as "dealing with this waking nightmare, things seem so surreal that they're unbelievable … trying to find optimism and a motivating force and realising that the 99% of us have more in common than we think". The success of Nightmare Logic, as well as sharing the stage with the likes of Ozzy Osbourne, Anthrax, Exodus, Testament, D.R.I., Suicidal Tendencies, Napalm Death, Lamb of God, Hatebreed, Five Finger Death Punch, Opeth, Danzig and Obituary, helped Power Trip become one of the most popular thrash metal bands in the 2010s.

In 2018, the album Opening Fire: 2008–2014 was released as a way to compile their extra tracks. In late 2019, Power Trip announced that they were working on their third album.

Vocalist Riley Gale died on August 24, 2020, at the age of 34. His death was announced by the band the next day. In May 2021, it was reported that the official cause of death was ruled by the Dallas County's medical examiner as an accidental overdose from the "toxic effects" of fentanyl. The report also claimed that Gale, who reportedly had a history of depression and drug abuse, had been found "unresponsive on the floor at home" and the only other substance found in his system was marijuana.

At the time of Gale's death, Power Trip was on the bill for a European tour with Lamb of God and Kreator, which was originally scheduled to take place in the spring of 2020 before the COVID-19 pandemic resulted in the tour being rescheduled to late 2021 and again to late 2022; the band was eventually replaced by Thy Art Is Murder and Gatecreeper.

In a March 2021 interview with Los Angeles Times, the surviving members of Power Trip stated that they are unsure of the band's future, but have not ruled out the possibility of continuing in Gale's memory. Lead guitarist Blake Ibanez commented, "We do want to continue to play music together; we just are not sure what that looks like at this time."

Musical style and influences
Their sound has been described by critics as thrash metal and hardcore punk, as well as simply crossover thrash. Gale cited the importance of guitar riffs and pop songs: "Some of Blake [Ibanez]'s favorite bands are Killing Joke, Stone Roses, Siouxsie and the Banshees, the Wipers". Gale said that he worked hard to do concise lyrics: "each word relates to the sentence, and how the sentence relates to the verse. Making sure everything's connected and there's not a syllable wasted." "I try to write something that's catchy that people can sing along to mindlessly". "[I write about] the frustrations with what I see. People's motivations". AllMusic wrote that their music reached fans of both "hardcore punk and extreme music".

Band members

Current members
 Blake Ibanez – lead guitar, vocals (2008–present)
 Nick Stewart – rhythm guitar, vocals (2008–present)
 Chris Whetzel – bass (2008–present)
 Chris Ulsh – drums, vocals (2009–present)

Former members
 Riley Gale – lead vocals (2008–2020; his death)
 Marcus Johnson – drums (2008–2009)

Discography

Studio albums

Compilation albums

Live albums

Singles

EPs

Awards and nominations 
Grammy Awards

|-
| 2021 || Executioner's Tax (Swing of the Axe) - Live || Best Metal Performance ||

References

External links

2008 establishments in Texas
American thrash metal musical groups
Crossover thrash groups
Hardcore punk groups from Texas
Heavy metal musical groups from Texas
Musical groups established in 2008
Musical groups from Dallas
Musical quintets